John Palmer (c. 1738 – 19 July 1817) was an English architect who worked on some of the notable buildings in the city of Bath, Somerset, UK.  He succeeded Thomas Baldwin as City Architect in 1792. He died in Bath.

Some works

 St James' Church, Bath, on Stall Street (1768–1769, demolished for the Marks & Spencer building)
 St James's Parade (1768)
 Cottles House, now Stonar School, Atworth, Wiltshire (1775)
 Church of St Swithin, Bath, The Paragon, Bath (1777–1780)
 Shockerwick House, Bathford, Somerset (1785)
 Lansdown Crescent, Bath, and the adjacent Lansdown Place West and Lansdown Place East (1789-1793)
 Cross Bath remodelled by Palmer after work by Thomas Baldwin (1789)
 Grand Pump Room, Bath, begun in 1789 by Thomas Baldwin who resigned in 1791; Palmer continued the scheme
 St George's Place (c.1790)
 Cumberland House, Norfolk Crescent, Bath (c. 1790–1800, continued by John Pinch after 1810)
 Park Street (1790-1793)
 1-8, Bath Street (1791-1794)
 Nelson Place West, Bath (c. 1800–1820, continued by John Pinch after 1810)
 Stall Street, Bath (c. 1790–1800)
 St James's Square, Bath (1791–1794)
 St James's Street (1791)
 6-9, Abbey Church Yard (1790s)
 Royal Mineral Water Hospital additions, Bath (1793)
 Kensington Chapel, London Road, Walcot, Bath (1794)
 Kensington Place, Bath, London Road, Walcot, Bath (1795)
 10, Abbey Church Yard (c.1795)
 Christ Church, Bath (1798)
 Theatre Royal, Bath (1804–1805), designed by George Dance the Younger and erected by Palmer
 New Bond Street, Bath (1805–1807)

References

 H.M. Colvin, A Biographical Dictionary of British Architects, 1600–1840 (1997). .
 Michael Forsyth, Bath, Pevsner Architectural Guides (2003). .
 Jane Root, "Thomas Baldwin: His Public Career in Bath, 1775–1793" (in, ed. Trevor Fawcett, Bath History, Volume V Bath: Millstream Books Publishing Limited, 1994), pages 80–103.

1738 births
1817 deaths
18th-century English architects
19th-century English architects
Architects from Bath, Somerset